The 1991 Sultan Azlan Shah Cup was the 4th edition of the Sultan Azlan Shah Cup, an invitational international field hockey tournament. It took place in Ipoh, Malaysia at the Azlan Shah Stadium from 28 July to 3 August 1991.

This was the first time the tournament was held after a period of four years with the previous three editions held after every two years. India won its second title remaining unbeaten in the round-robin format. India became the first team to regain the tournament after having won their first title in 1985.

Participating nations
Six countries participated in the 1991 tournament:

Results

Round-robin 

Rules for classification: 1) points; 2) goal difference; 3) goals scored; 4) head-to-head result.

Fixtures

Final ranking
This ranking does not reflect the actual performance of the team as the ranking issued by the International Hockey Federation. This is just a benchmark ranking in the Sultan Azlan Shah Cup only.

References

External links
Official website

1991 in field hockey
1991
1991 in Malaysian sport
1991 in Indian sport
1991 in Pakistani sport
1991 in Soviet sport
1991 in New Zealand sport
1991 in South Korean sport